This is a list of defunct airlines of the State of Qatar:

Defunct airlines

See also
 List of airlines of Qatar
 List of airports in Qatar

References

Airlines
Airlines, defunct
State of Qatar